The 2016 Losail Superbike World Championship round was the thirteenth and last round of the 2016 Superbike World Championship. It took place over the weekend of 28–30 October 2016 at the Losail International Circuit.

Championship standings after the race

Championship standings after Race 1

Championship standings after Race 2

Supersport Championship standings

External links
 Superbike Race 1 results
 Superbike Race 2 results
 Supersport Race results

2016 Superbike World Championship season
Superbike World Championship
Losail Superbike World Championship